Mazure is a family name. People with the surname Mazure include:

 Alfred Mazure (1914–1974), Dutch cartoonist, writer and filmmaker
 Carolyn M. Mazure (1949-), medical researcher
 Edmond Mazure (1860–1939) South Australian winemaker
 Jannes Pieter Mazure (1899–1990), outspoken Dutch politician
 Sébastien Mazure (born 1979) French football player